Baliuag University (B.U. or Baliuag U) is a private university in the Philippines. It was founded in 1925 and is the first school granted full autonomy in Central Luzon by the Commission on Higher Education. 

It offers graduate programs in education, business, library science and nursing. Its undergraduate programs in business administration and accountancy, liberal arts and education are Level 3 accredited. Other offerings are engineering, nursing, library science, computer studies and hospitality management. It offers two-year Voc-Tech, Associate in Health Science as well as kinder, grade school and high school programs, LET review classes, call center training and college evening programs.

It is one of four IMCI (Integrated Management of Childhood Illness) training school in the Philippines, with University of the Philippines Diliman, University of Santo Tomas, and St. Paul University Iloilo.

Academics

Basic Education
Kindergarten
Grade School (Grades 1-6)
Junior High School (Grades 7-10)
Senior High School (Grades 11 and 12)

Undergraduate

College of Liberal Arts and General Education (CLAGE)
Bachelor of Arts in Communication (Level III Reacrredited)
Bachelor of Arts in Communication and Bachelor of Arts in Journalism (a double-degree program in partnership with Manila Times College)  
Bachelor of Arts in Political Science (Level III Reaccredited)

College of Business Administration and Accountancy (CBAA)
Bachelor of Science in Accountancy (Level II Reaccredited)
Bachelor of Science in Management Accounting
Bachelor of Science in Business Administration (Level IV Reaccredited), Major in:
Human Resource Development Management
Marketing Management
Financial Management

College of Education and Human Development (CEHD)
Bachelor of Early Childhood Education
Bachelor of Elementary Education (Level IV 1st Reaccredited)
Bachelor of Secondary Education  (Level IV 1st Reaccredited), Major in:
English
Filipino
Mathematics
Science
Bachelor of Physical Education
Bachelor of Library and Information Science (Candidate for Accreditation)
Bachelor of Science in Psychology
Bachelor of Science in Social Work
Certificate in Teacher Education
Post-Baccalaureate Diploma in Alternative Learning System

College of Environmental Design and Engineering (CEDE)
Bachelor of Science in Civil Engineering (Level II Reaccredited)
Bachelor of Science in Computer Engineering
Bachelor of Science in Electrical Engineering
Bachelor of Science in Electronics Engineering
Bachelor of Science in Industrial Engineering
Bachelor of Science in Mechanical Engineering

College of Nursing and Allied Health Sciences (CNAHS)
Bachelor of Science in Nursing (Level IV Reaccredited)
Bachelor of Science in Nutrition and Dietetics
Bachelor of Science in Medical Technology/Medical Laboratory Science

College of Information Technology Education (CITE)
Associate in Computer Technology
Bachelor of Science in Computer Science (Level II 1st Reaccredited), Major in:
Animation and Game Development
Software Development
Bachelor of Science in Information Technology (Level II 1st Reaccredited), Major in:
Web and Mobile Application Development
Network Administration and Security Management 
Service Management for BPO

College of Hospitality Management and Tourism (CHMT)
Bachelor of Science in Hospitality Management
Bachelor of Science in Tourism Management

School of Graduate Studies
Doctoral Programs
Doctor of Education (Ed.D.)
Doctor of Business Administration (DBA)
Master's Program
Master in Business Administration (MBA) (Level III Reaccredited)
Master in Public Administration (MPA)
Master of Library & Information Science (MLIS)
Master of Arts in Nursing (MAN)
Master of Science in Nursing (MSN), Non-Thesis
Master of Science in Hospitality & Tourism Management (MSHTM)
Master of Arts in Education (MAEd) (Level III Reaccredited)
Master of Arts in Teaching (MAT)
Master in Information Technology (MIT)

Baliuag University Cultural and Sports Center
The Baliuag University Cultural and Sports Center is a gymnasium complex located at the Annex 2 of the university. The ground floor serves as the mock hotel, College of Hospitality Management and Tourism (CHMT), and the second floor is the gymnasium which can seat 2,000 or more people. It serves as the Faculty of the Physical Education department. It was used in many activities such as sports, studies and events.

The Green Building (University I.T. Building)
The new Green Building is the home of College of Information Technology Education (CITE) and medical/dental clinic of the university. It has IT laboratories for kinder to college, and solar panels to act as the energy source of the building. It also reduces pollution by using natural sources of energy.

Library
Baliuag University is one of the few universities that has a complete division of a library network. It has the general or the Reference library wherein the Map section is, the Circulation library, the Filipiniana library, and the Student Study Center: divided into the University Archives and the Baliuag Artifacts.

The Internet library is a computer laboratory on the second floor. It acts as the online library of the university as well as a research facility. Another addition to the library network is the multimedia kiosk.

Annexes
 Main Campus is the seat of administration of the university. It houses the offices, main facilities, chapel, library, and the quadrangle. Five of the seven colleges of the university are located here.  
 Annex 2 is beside the main campus and is linked by an overpass. it houses the I.T laboratories, the Elementary department and the High School department as well as the B.U Cultural and Sports Center and Green Building. Two of the seven colleges of the university are located here. 
 Annex 3 is west of the main campus and northwest of Annex 2. It houses more courses, classrooms and parking space. The architecture of the building marks the "brick design" trademark of B.U., influencing several renovated renditions of the B.U main gate, and the Green Building.
 Annex 4 is the Tumana Campus located in Brgy. San Jose, Baliwag. It houses two outdoor courts for basketball and volleyball, open field, and classrooms for technical-vocational courses. This campus is also sometimes used for intramurals events due to its sports facilities and open wide area.
 Annex 5 is located on Brgy. Tibag, Baliwag. This small campus houses additional classrooms for graduate studies.
 Annex 6 is the newest campus of the university. It is located on Brgy. Poblacion, the commercial center of the town. It houses the Grade 12 department of Senior High School.

Notable alumni
https://baliuagu.edu.ph/post-categories/proudtobebu

References

External links

 

Educational institutions established in 1925
Universities and colleges in Bulacan
1925 establishments in the Philippines